Charles Edward Coleridge (2 June 1827 - 1 May 1875) was an English amateur cricketer who played first-class cricket from 1848 to 1852.

Born in Eton, Buckinghamshire, he was mainly associated with Oxford University and Hampshire and made 11 known appearances in first-class matches.

Coleridge went up to Balliol College, Oxford, in 1846 and graduated in 1850. He then was admitted to the Middle Temple and was called to the bar in 1853. He died in Westminster.

References

External links
 CricketArchive profile

Further reading
 H S Altham, A History of Cricket, Volume 1 (to 1914), George Allen & Unwin, 1962
 Arthur Haygarth, Scores & Biographies, Volumes 1-11 (1744-1870), Lillywhite, 1862-72

1827 births
1875 deaths
Charles Edward
English cricketers
English cricketers of 1826 to 1863
Oxford University cricketers
Hampshire cricketers
Marylebone Cricket Club cricketers
Gentlemen of England cricketers
Oxford and Cambridge Universities cricketers
Alumni of Balliol College, Oxford
English barristers
North v South cricketers
Gentlemen of the South cricketers